Lynda Chouiten (ليندة شويتن) an Algerian writer in French. She is the author of several books, she works on French and Francophone Cultures and Literatures, Postcolonial Culture and Literature, Comparative Literature, Travel Literature, Orientalism, Cultural Representation, Literary Theory, British Literature and Civilization (especially Victorian), Discourse and Power, Gender Studies.

PhD in French Studies from The Moore Institute for Research in the Humanities and Social Sciences National University of Ireland, Galway. She is Head of the Scientific Committee of the Department of Foreign Languages & Literatures (University of Boumerdes) from September 2015.

Her novel, Une Valse, won the 2019 Assia Djebar Great Prize.

Works
 Isabelle Eberhardt
 Essays on the Discursive Constructions, Manifestations, and Subversions of Authority
 Translated poetry "Just Above Silence" (Juste au-dessus du silence) by Anna Greki.

References

Living people
People from Tizi Ouzou
21st-century Algerian writers
21st-century Algerian women writers
Year of birth missing (living people)